Michael John Byron (born 16 August 1987) is an English footballer who plays as a defender.

Club career
Byron came through the Academy at Hull City and earned himself a one-year contract in 2006. He spent much of that first year on loan to first Conference North Hinckley United and then League Two Notts County. He did not make any senior appearances for Hull, and was released at the end of the season.

He suffered an injury whilst on loan at Notts County, but signed for them once he was fit again in September 2007.

To re-gain his match fitness, he signed a three-month loan deal back at Hinckley United in November 2007. In January 2008 he signed an 18-month contract with Hinckley United after being released by Notts County, but left the club in June 2008.

He then joined Droylsden where he stayed for three years, before a brief period at Northwich Victoria where he made less than twenty starts. This was followed by a move to Welsh club Bala Town in June 2011.

In January 2013 he was released by Bala and promptly snapped back up by Droylsden.

International career
Byron played for England C in a 4–0 victory over the Malta under-21 team in February 2009.

References

1987 births
Living people
Footballers from Liverpool
English footballers
England semi-pro international footballers
Association football defenders
Hull City A.F.C. players
Hinckley United F.C. players
Notts County F.C. players
Droylsden F.C. players
Northwich Victoria F.C. players
Bala Town F.C. players
English Football League players
Cymru Premier players